Zenéy van der Walt (born 22 May 2000) is a South African athlete specialising in the 400 metres hurdles. She won gold medals at the 2017 World U18 Championships and the 2018 World U20 Championships. In 2019, she won a silver medal at the Universiade.

International competitions

Personal bests
Outdoor
400 metres – 52.89 (Sopot 2019)
400 metres hurdles – 55.05 (Pretoria 2018)

References

External links

2000 births
Living people
South African female sprinters
South African female hurdlers
Universiade medalists in athletics (track and field)
Universiade silver medalists for South Africa
Athletes (track and field) at the 2019 African Games
White South African people
World Athletics U20 Championships winners
Medalists at the 2019 Summer Universiade
African Games competitors for South Africa
World Youth Championships in Athletics winners
African Championships in Athletics winners
21st-century South African women